Jamthi Khurd is a village in Hingoli District in the Indian state of Maharashtra.

It comes under Hingoli Taluka of Hingoli District &  Aurangabad Division in Maharashtra.

Its coordinates are at R493+WV Jamthi Kh., Maharashtra which is Plus Code and 19.819N 77.104E. According to the 2011 population of India, it has 1451 people.

References

Villages in Hingoli district